The Lower Baoquan Dam was completed in 1994 on the Yuhe River, a tributary of the Yalu River, and is a masonry gravity type.

Notes

Dams completed in 1994
Dams in China
Masonry dams
Gravity dams